Charles-Arthur Gauthier (May 12, 1913 – May 12, 1997) was a Canadian undertaker and long-time politician. He was a member of Parliament (MP) for the Social Credit Party and Ralliement Créditiste. Gauthier was first elected to the House of Commons of Canada representing Roberval, Quebec, in the 1962 election. In 1963, he and numerous other Quebec Socred MPs joined Réal Caouette in forming the Ralliement Créditiste, a Quebec breakaway from the federal Social Credit Party that rejoined the federal party in 1971.

Gauthier was acting leader of the Social Credit Party following the resignation of Gilles Caouette in 1978 and again in 1979 following the resignation of Lorne Reznowski. Gauthier said he did not wish to lead the party into an election and Fabien Roy was drafted as leader. Gauthier retained his seat in the 1979 federal election but was defeated in the 1980 election that wiped out the party.

External links
 

1913 births
1997 deaths
Members of the House of Commons of Canada from Quebec
Social Credit Party of Canada MPs
Social Credit Party of Canada leaders
People from Dolbeau-Mistassini